Rebuilding Together is an American non-profit organization with the goal of preserving affordable homeownership and revitalizing neighborhoods through free home repairs and modifications for neighbors in need.

Rebuilding Together has rehabbed more than 200,000 homes, nonprofit, and community centers in the U.S. Rebuilding Together affiliate network consists of (142) offices throughout the United States, who act in partnership with and on behalf of the organization.

Rebuilding Together has several targeted programs that address the needs of specific homeowner populations: veterans, elderly, disabled, and victims of disaster. The work of Rebuilding Together impacts the condition of the surrounding community as well, through community center rehabilitation, playground builds, and partnerships with organizations focused on energy efficiency, sustainable community gardens, volunteer engagement, and homeowner education.

History 
Rebuilding Together was founded as "Christmas in April" in Midland, Texas, by Bobby Trimble in April 1973 to help neighbors in need, based on the concept of neighbors helping neighbors, such as a barn raising. The program got its name when one of the early recipients likened the help of having “Christmas in April.” 

Patricia Riley Johnson founded the national office in Washington, DC, in 1988 after founding and running Christmas in April in Washington, DC since 1983. The national office was called Christmas in April USA at the time. On her time as Executive Director of the Washington affiliate: "They offered me a part-time job and told me it would probably take half a year to organize the next rehab project. They had repaired 18 houses their first year. The year I took over we completed 85.," wrote Mrs. Johnson in the New York Times.

The national office helped grow the affiliate network to 260 affiliates across the United States, including Alaska and Hawaii. The organization previously owned its own national headquarters building in the Dupont Circle neighborhood of Washington, DC. Johnson, who was named a Washingtonian of Year by Washingtonian magazine in 1995, retired from Rebuilding Together in 2006 and was named Canon Missioner of the Washington National Cathedral. Subsequently, Patty Johnson passed away unexpectedly at the age of 71 in 2017. A foundation was formed in her honor, the Saint & Streetfighter Foundation. 

Today, Rebuilding Together has grown into a premier nonprofit community revitalization organization that "together, with our corporate and community partners, repairs homes, revitalizes communities and rebuilds lives. Rebuilding Together’s local affiliates and nearly 100,000 volunteers complete about 10,000 rebuild projects nationwide each year."

Examples of programs 
 National Rebuilding Day is the signature event of Rebuilding Together. Held on the last Saturday in April, National Rebuilding Day is the day when affiliates plan projects to celebrate the organization's mission and to bring national attention to the plight of America's low-income homeowners. The day is embraced by community leaders and national corporate sponsors as a way of bringing impact to America's communities in a single day.
 In the wake of Hurricanes Katrina and Rita, Rebuilding Together launched the Gulf Coast Operations initiative and a commitment to rebuild 1,000 homes across the Gulf Coast. Rebuild 1000 is executed in partnership with its Gulf Coast affiliates, sponsors, and thousands of volunteers.
 Rebuilding Together's Veterans Housing was created to meet the needs of veterans from past and present wars.  Rebuilding Together fills the gaps in modifications and repair services that retired and active service men and women struggle to meet.
 Rebuilding Together's AmeriCorps program, called the Rebuilding Together CapacityCorps is a National AmeriCorps program of 70 full-time AmeriCorps members serving in 30 Rebuilding Together affiliates in 23 states. Rebuilding Together CapacityCorps members increase the capacity of Rebuilding Together affiliates to serve additional low-income homeowners through volunteer recruitment, client outreach, repairs for low-income homeowners, new project implementation, community partnership development, and program expansion.

References

External links 

 Official website

Non-profit organizations based in Washington, D.C.
Housing organizations in the United States